Ankerbach is a small river of North Rhine-Westphalia, Germany. It has a length of 4.4 km and its drainage basin has am area of 3 km2. It joins the Rhine river at km 650.55, near Bonn.

See also
List of rivers of North Rhine-Westphalia

Rivers of North Rhine-Westphalia
Rivers of Germany